Peter Noah is an American television writer and producer. He served as an executive producer and regular writer for the NBC drama The West Wing. Noah first became involved with the series as a consulting producer and regular writer for the fifth season and was promoted to supervising producer before the season's end. He continued in this role for the sixth season before becoming an executive producer for the seventh and final season.

Along with his fellow producers he was nominated for the Emmy Award for Outstanding Drama Series for three consecutive years (2004–2006) for his work on The West Wing. In 2006 he was also nominated for the WGA award for best dramatic series. Noah went on to executive produce The West Wing star Jimmy Smits's next series Cane.

He has also written on The Firm, Scandal, Kingdom and Designated Survivor.

His brother is journalist Timothy Noah, and his nephew is Maroon 5 frontman, Adam Levine.

References

External links

American male screenwriters
American television writers
Jewish American screenwriters
Living people
American television producers
The West Wing
Year of birth missing (living people)
Place of birth missing (living people)
American male television writers